Sean Thomas Devine (born 6 September 1972) is a retired professional footballer who played as a striker.

Biography
He began his career with Millwall. Having spent time on loan with Woking in 1992, he spent two years with Bromley and one with Fisher Athletic before moving to Cyprus to play for Anorthosis Famagusta in the summer of 1995. Four months later, he returned to England and signed for Barnet.

Devine was Barnet's top scorer for three seasons and in 1996 he was offered a trial at Premiership club West Ham United. However, the high-profile transfer was cancelled after he was struck down by groin and hernia problems which kept him out of action for eight months. Devine had scored 16 goals before Christmas that season and he returned to fitness only after a rehabilitation spell at Lilleshall during the summer of 1997. Devine continued to score goals for Barnet and managed to break the club's league goalscoring record but an alleged fall-out with Bees Manager John Still brought an end to his future at Underhill.

In April 1999, after a successful loan spell at the club, Devine signed for Wycombe Wanderers for a fee of £200,000. He scored eight goals in 12 league appearances that season that made a major contributing factor to Wycombe's last day escape from relegation in the 1998–99 season. Devine also set a Wycombe club record for most goals in a single season by scoring 23 goals during the 1999–2000 campaign. However, a knee injury caused him to miss the whole of the 2000–01 season and after that he was unable to regain his old goalscoring form at the club. Devine stayed for two more years and went on to become Wycombe's all-time record Football League goalscorer, a record he had now achieved for two clubs. During the 2002–03 season, Devine began to fall out of favour with Wycombe manager Lawrie Sanchez and this led to the player requesting a transfer away from the club. Sanchez felt that Devine was no longer the same player since his injury and accepted a £70,000 offer from Exeter City, with the deal being concluded in January 2003.

In January 2005, Devine captained his Exeter side in an FA Cup third round match against Manchester United at Old Trafford, in which the non-league side secured a famous 0-0 result. After that season, Devine left England and signed for the New Zealand Knights making just seven appearances before club was dissolved in January 2007.

Devine also played as an Irish B international in a team that included Robbie Keane and Damien Duff in February 1998.

References

External links

1972 births
Living people
People from the London Borough of Lewisham
Association football forwards
English footballers
Republic of Ireland association footballers
Republic of Ireland B international footballers
Millwall F.C. players
Woking F.C. players
Bromley F.C. players
Fisher Athletic F.C. players
Anorthosis Famagusta F.C. players
Wycombe Wanderers F.C. players
Barnet F.C. players
Exeter City F.C. players
New Zealand Knights FC players
Metro F.C. players
English Football League players
A-League Men players
Cypriot First Division players
Expatriate footballers in Cyprus
Expatriate association footballers in New Zealand